The 1944 United States presidential election in Ohio was held on November 7, 1944 as part of the 1944 United States presidential election. State voters chose 25 electors to the Electoral College, who voted for president and vice president.

Ohio was narrowly won by Republican Party candidate Thomas E. Dewey with 50.18% of the popular vote; Dewey's running mate was incumbent Ohio Governor John W. Bricker. The Democratic candidate, incumbent President Franklin D. Roosevelt got 49.82% of the popular vote. This election was one of only three occasions since 1892 the Buckeye State has voted for a losing candidate, the others being in 1960 for Richard Nixon and 2020 for Donald Trump. This also marks the last time that Ohio voted for a candidate who never won the presidency (as Nixon would win the White House later in 1968 and Trump was already the incumbent president in 2020) and the last time that an incumbent president of either party won another term in office without winning Ohio.

Results

Results by county

See also
 United States presidential elections in Ohio

References

Ohio
1944
1944 Ohio elections